The Bulgaria men's national under-18 ice hockey team is the men's national under-18 ice hockey team of Bulgaria. The team is controlled by the Bulgarian Ice Hockey Federation, a member of the International Ice Hockey Federation. The team represents Bulgaria at the IIHF World U18 Championships.

International competitions

IIHF World U18 Championships

1999: 6th in Division II Europe
2000: 6th in Division II Europe
2001: 6th in Division III
2002: 7th in Division III
2003: 6th in Division II Group A
2004: 4th in Division III
2005: 6th in Division III

2006: 5th in Division III
2007: Did not qualify 
2008: 4th in Division III Group B
2009: 4th in Division III Group B
2010: 4th in Division III Group A
2011: 3rd in Division III Group A
2012: 4th in Division III
2013: 4th in Division III Group A
2014: 4th in Division III Group A
2015: 3rd in Division III Group A

External links
Bulgaria at IIHF.com

Under
National under-18 ice hockey teams